Facundo Omar Laumann (born 14 March 1990) is an Argentine professional footballer who plays as a centre-back for Villa Mitre.

Career
Olimpo were Laumann's first club. He moved into their senior squad ahead of the 2008–09 Primera B Nacional, featuring seven times in a season that they finished seventeenth. Laumann had a 2010 stint with Rosario Puerto Belgrano, though returned to Olimpo in 2011; no league appearances followed, though he did appear in the Copa Argentina versus Central Norte. After spending 2012–13 in Torneo Argentino B on loan with Tiro Federal, Laumann left Olimpo permanently to join Chacarita Juniors of Primera B Metropolitana in August 2013. He made his debut on 14 August in a one-nil loss versus Colegiales.

Laumann completed a return to Tiro Federal on 30 June 2014. They won promotion from Torneo Federal B to Torneo Federal A within his first five months back. One goal, versus Defensores de Belgrano, in thirty-seven third tier matches followed. July 2016 saw Primera C Metropolitana's Defensores Unidos sign Laumann. Two years on, the club were promoted to Primera B Metropolitana after the defender had scored twice in seventy-two appearances. His first goal came in a win away from home over Almirante Brown on 9 March 2019. July 2019 saw Villa Mitre sign Laumann.

Career statistics
.

Honours
Defensores Unidos
Primera C Metropolitana: 2017–18

References

External links

1990 births
Living people
Sportspeople from Bahía Blanca
Argentine footballers
Association football defenders
Primera Nacional players
Torneo Argentino B players
Primera B Metropolitana players
Torneo Federal A players
Primera C Metropolitana players
Olimpo footballers
Chacarita Juniors footballers
Defensores Unidos footballers
Villa Mitre footballers
Argentine people of Volga German descent